Melanoides nyassana is a species of freshwater snail with a gill and an operculum, an aquatic gastropod mollusk in the family Thiaridae.

It is endemic to Lake Malawi, where it is widespread.

Melania truncatelliformis Bourguignat, 1889 may be a synonym of Melanoides nyassana. The IUCN Red List of Threatened Species treats the species as a synonym of Melanoides polymorpha.

References

Fauna of Lake Malawi
Invertebrates of Malawi
Invertebrates of Mozambique
Invertebrates of Tanzania
Freshwater snails of Africa
Thiaridae
Gastropods described in 1877
Taxa named by Edgar Albert Smith
Taxobox binomials not recognized by IUCN
Taxonomy articles created by Polbot